is a Japanese sociologist and professor at Tokyo Metropolitan University.

He has a PhD from the University of Tokyo for his research on Mathematical sociology. Using the method of game theory, he analyzed how the power of the state works in society.  He is one of the most outspoken sociologists in Japan, and is currently working on the strategy the Japanese government should adopt for the 21st century.

He has been a constant presence in the world of Japanese letters since the publication of his PhD dissertation in 1989.  His controversial work on compensated dating in Japan was the subject of much discussion after its publication.

History
Miyadai entered Tokyo University in 1978 to become a film director. He majored in sociology which he thought might be useful. Meeting Wataru Hiromatsu and Naoki Komuro made Miyadai study seriously. Reading Noam Chomsky also inspired him.

On November 29, 2022, Miyadai was attacked at the Minami-Osawa campus in Hachioji in a widely-reported knife attack. A suspect in the attack committed suicide on December 16, 2022 without explaining his motives.

References

1959 births
Living people
People from Sendai
University of Tokyo alumni
Japanese sociologists
Academic staff of Tokyo Metropolitan University
Stabbing survivors